Thatcher on Acid were an English anarcho-punk band. They formed in Somerset during 1983. Their name is a satirical reference to former UK prime minister Margaret Thatcher. Ben Corrigan, Bob Butler and Andy Tuck also played in Schwartzeneggar with ex-Crass member, Steve Ignorant.
The band opened the anarcho-punk band Conflict's "Gathering of the 5000" show at Brixton Academy, an event which resulted in many arrests and achieved a degree of infamy.

Bassist Bob Butler died in 2022.

Members 
Ben Corrigan – guitar/vocals
Mat – bass/vocals
Martin – drums (1983–1987)
Andy Tuck – drums (1987 onwards)
Bob Butler – bass (died 2022)

Discography

Singles & EPs 
Moondance (1986 – 12" – All the Madmen)
Flannel 905 (1990 – 7" – Rugger Bugger Discs)
Thatcher On Acid Meets Steerpike – The Illusion Of Being Together (1990 – 12" – Meantime Records)
Can We Laugh Now? / No Fucking War (1992 – Split EP with 7 Year Bitch – Clawfist Records)
Yo Yo Man (1992 – 7" – K Records)
"Frank" Jr. (1992 – 7" – Subcorridor Records)
Chagrin (1992 – 7" – Desperate Attempt Records)

LPs 
Curdled (1987 – All the Madmen)
Frank (1991 – Agit-Prop)
Squib (1992 – split CD with Wat Tyler named Yurp Thing – Allied Records)

Compilations & live albums 
Thatcher On Acid (1988 – also known as Garlic – Rugger Bugger Records)
Curdled/The Moondance (1997 – reissued of first LP plus first 12" – Broken Rekids Record)
Pressing: 84-91 (1995 – Desperate Attempt Records)

References

External links 
Thatcher On Acid on last.fm
[ Thatcher On Acid] at Allmusic
Review of Frank

Anarcho-punk groups
English punk rock groups
Musical groups from Somerset
Musical groups established in 1983
Musical groups disestablished in 1998
1983 establishments in England
1998 disestablishments in England